The Vitória-Minas Railway (EFVM) is a railway line linking the cities of Belo Horizonte, Minas Gerais and Vitória, Espírito Santo, in Brazil. The first stretch of the railway, between Vitória and Diamantina, was inaugurated on 13 May 1904. The line is one of the few in Brazil to carry passengers as well as cargo.

References

Metre gauge railways in Brazil